Niyaz Pulatov (born 21 September 1998) is a Uzbekistani male taekwondo practitioner. He won the silver medal in the men's bantamweight event at the 2022 World Taekwondo Championships held in Guadalajara, Mexico. He represented Uzbekistan at the 2018 Asian Games and claimed a silver medal in the men's 58kg flyweight event.

References 

1998 births
Living people
Uzbekistani male taekwondo practitioners
Taekwondo practitioners at the 2018 Asian Games
Medalists at the 2018 Asian Games
Asian Games silver medalists for Uzbekistan
Asian Games medalists in taekwondo
Medalists at the 2019 Summer Universiade
Universiade medalists in taekwondo
Universiade silver medalists for Uzbekistan
World Taekwondo Championships medalists
Asian Taekwondo Championships medalists
Islamic Solidarity Games competitors for Uzbekistan
Islamic Solidarity Games medalists in taekwondo
21st-century Uzbekistani people